Seinäjoki Airport is an airport in Ilmajoki, Finland, about  south-southwest of Seinäjoki city centre. The airport has been operated since 2016 by Seinäjoen Lentoasema Oy (Seinäjoki Airport Ltd). Before that (from 1976 to 2016) it was operated by Rengonharju-säätiö (Rengonharju Foundation).

Facilities

Airlines and destinations
At the moment there are no scheduled flights and the traffic consists mainly of private business and charter flights, in addition to general aviation. In the past, scheduled flights from Seinäjoki have been operated at least by Finnair, Finncomm Airlines, Flybe Nordic, Direktflyg, Golden Air, Air Botnia and Wasawings which was the first scheduled operator of the airport in 1983.

Statistics

Passengers

Freight and Mail

See also

 List of airports in Finland
 List of the largest airports in the Nordic countries

References

External links
 
 Official airport website
 
 

Airports in Finland
Airport
Buildings and structures in South Ostrobothnia